The Song Is You is a 1994 box set by American singer Frank Sinatra.

This five disc box set contains every studio recording Frank Sinatra performed with Tommy Dorsey and his orchestra, a few tracks of alternate recording takes, and a full disc of mostly-unreleased radio broadcasts. It is considered a definitive look at the first years of what would become a half-a-century long career.

Track listing

Disc one
"The Sky Fell Down" (Edward Heyman, Louis Alter) - 3:14
"Too Romantic" (Johnny Burke, James Monaco) - 3:11
Recorded on February 1, 1940
"Shake Down the Stars" (Ed DeLange, Jimmy Van Heusen)
"Moments in the Moonlight" (Richard Himber, Irving Gordon, Alvin Kaufman)
"I'll Be Seeing You" (Sammy Fain, Irving Kahal)
Recorded on February 26, 1940
"Say It" (Frank Loesser, Jimmy McHugh)
"Polka Dots and Moonbeams" (Burke, Van Heusen)
Recorded on March 4, 1940
"The Fable of the Rose" (Bickley Reichner, Josef Myrow)
"This Is the Beginning of the End" (Mack Gordon)
Recorded on March 12, 1940
"Hear My Song Violetta" (Buddy Bernier, Robert Emmerich, Othmar Klase, Rudolph Inkesch)
"Fools Rush In (Where Angels Fear to Tread)" (Rube Bloom, Johnny Mercer)
"Devil May Care" (Burke, Harry Warren)
Recorded on March 29, 1940
"April Played the Fiddle" (Burke, Monaco)
"I Haven't the Time to Be a Millionaire" (Burke, Monaco)
"Imagination" (Burke, Van Heusen)
Recorded on April 10, 1940
"Yours Is My Heart Alone" (Franz Lehár, Fritz Löhner-Beda)
Recorded on March 25, 1940
"You're Lonely and I'm Lonely" (Irving Berlin)
"East of the Sun (and West of the Moon)" (Brooks Bowman)
"Head On My Pillow" (Bissel Palmer, Pierre Connor) 
"It's a Lovely Day Tomorrow" (Berlin)
Recorded on April 23, 1940
"I'll Never Smile Again" (Ruth Lowe)
"All This and Heaven Too" (DeLange, Van Heusen) 
"Where Do You Keep Your Heart?" (Al Stillman, Fred Ahlert)
Recorded on May 23, 1940

Disc two
"Whispering" (Vincent Rose, Richard Coburn, John Schonberger)
Recorded on June 13, 1940
"Trade Winds" (Cliff Friend, Charles Tobias)
"The One I Love (Belongs to Somebody Else)" (Isham Jones, Gus Kahn)
Recorded on June 27, 1940
"The Call of the Canyon" (Billy Hill)
"Love Lies" (Carl Sigman, Ralph Freed, Joseph Meyer) 
"I Could Make You Care" (Sammy Cahn, Saul Chaplin)
"The World Is in My Arms" (Yip Harburg, Burton Lane)
Recorded on July 17, 1940
"Our Love Affair" (Freed, Roger Edens) 
"Looking for Yesterday" (DeLange, Van Heusen) 
"Tell Me at Midnight" (Clay A. Boland, Bickley Reichner) 
"We Three (My Echo, My Shadow and Me)" (Dick Robertson, Nelson Cogane, Sammy Mysels)
Recorded on August 29, 1940
"When You Awake" (Henry Nemo)
"Anything" (DeLange, Frank Signorelli, P. Napoleon)
Recorded on September 9, 1940
"Shadows on the Sand" (Stanley Adams, Will Grosz) 
"You're Breaking My Heart All Over Again" (James Cavanaugh, John Redmond, Arthur Altman) 
"I'd Know You Anywhere" (Mercer, Jimmy McHugh)
Recorded on September 17, 1940
"Do You Know Why?" (Burke, Van Heusen)
Recorded on October 16, 1940
"Not So Long Ago" (Reichner, Boland)
"Stardust" (Hoagy Carmichael, Mitchell Parish)
Recorded on November 11, 1940
"Oh! Look at Me Now" (Joe Bushkin, John DeVries) 
"You Might Have Belonged to Another" (P. West, L. Harmon)
Recorded on January 6, 1941
"You Lucky People, You" (Burke, Van Heusen)
"It's Always You" (Burke, Van Heusen)
Recorded on January 15, 1941
"I Tried" (Carl Nutter, Paul Hand, Clark Dennis)
Recorded on January 20, 1941

Disc three
"Dolores" (Loesser, Alter)
"Without a Song" (Vincent Youmans, Edward Eliscu, Billy Rose)
Recorded on January 20, 1941
"Do I Worry?" (Bobby Worth, Stanley Cowan) 
"Everything Happens to Me" (Matt Dennis, Tom Adair)
Recorded on February 7, 1941
"Let's Get Away from It All" (Dennis, Adair)
Recorded on February 17, 1941
"I'll Never Let a Day Pass By" (Loesser, Victor Schertzinger) 
"Love Me As I Am" (Loesser, Alter)
"This Love of Mine" (Sol Parker, Hank Sanicola, Frank Sinatra)
Recorded on May 28, 1941
"I Guess I'll Have to Dream the Rest" (Mickey Stoner, Bud Green, Martin Block)
"You & I" (Meredith Willson)
"Neiani" (Axel Stordahl, Sy Oliver)
"Free for All" (Tom Adair, Matt Dennis)
Recorded on June 27, 1941
"Blue Skies" (Berlin)
Recorded on July 15, 1941
"Two In Love" (Meredith Willson) 
"Pale Moon (An Indian Love Song)" (Jesse Glick, Frederick Logan)
Recorded on August 19, 1941
"I Think of You" (J. Elliot, Don Marcotte)
"How Do You Do Without Me?" (Bushkin, DeVries)
"A Sinner Kissed An Angel" (Mack David, Larry Shayne)
Recorded on September 18, 1941
"Violets for Your Furs" (Dennis, Adair) 
"The Sunshine of Your Smile" (Leonard Cooke, Lillian Ray) 
Recorded on September 26, 1941
"How About You?" (Lane, Ralph Freed)
Recorded on December 22, 1941
"Snootie Little Cutie" (Bobby Troup)
Recorded on February 19, 1942

Disc four
"Poor You" (Harburg, Lane)
"I'll Take Tallulah" (Harburg, Lane)
"The Last Call for Love" (Harburg, Lane, M. Cummings)
Recorded on February 19, 1942
"Somewhere a Voice Is Calling" (Eileen Newton, Arthur Tate)
Recorded on March 9, 1942
"Just As Though You Were Here" (DeLange, John Benson Brooks)
"Street of Dreams" (Victor Young, Sam M. Lewis)
Recorded on May 18, 1942
"Take Me" (Bloom, David) 
"Be Careful, It's My Heart" (Berlin)
Recorded on June 9, 1942
"In the Blue of Evening" (Adair, Alfred D'Artega) 
"Dig Down Deep" (Walter Hirsch, Gerald Marks, S. Marco)
Recorded on June 17, 1942
"There Are Such Things" (Stanley Adams, George W. Meyer, Abel Baer)
"Daybreak" (Harold Adamson, Ferde Grofe) 
"It Started All Over Again" (Bill Carey, Carl T. Fischer)
Recorded on July 1, 1942
"Light a Candle In the Chapel" (Harry Pease, Ed G. Nelson, Duke Leonard)
Recorded on July 2, 1942
"Too Romantic" [Take 2]
Recorded on February 1, 1940
"Shake Down the Stars" [Take 2]
Recorded on February 26, 1940
"Hear My Song Violetta" (Take 2)
Recorded on March 29, 1940
"You're Lonely and I'm Lonely" [Take 3]
Recorded on April 23, 1940
"Our Love Affair" [Take 2]
Recorded on August 29, 1940
"Violets for Your Furs" [Take 2]
Recorded on August 19, 1941
"The Night We Called It a Day" (Dennis, Adair)
"The Lamplighter's Serenade" (Carmichael, Paul Francis Webster)
"The Song Is You" (Jerome Kern, Oscar Hammerstein II) 
"Night and Day" (Cole Porter)
Recorded on January 19, 1942

Disc Five (Radio Broadcasts)
Theme: "I'm Getting Sentimental Over You" (George Bassman, Ned Washington) 
"Who?" (Kern, Otto Harbach, Hammerstein II) 
"I Hear a Rhapsody" (George Fragos, Jack Baker, Dick Gasparre) 
"I'll Never Smile Again"
"Half-Way Down the Street" (Fred Waring)
"Some of Your Sweetness (Got Into My Heart)" (J. Clayborn, G. Clayborn)
"Once in a While"
"A Little In Love"
"It Came to Me"
"Only Forever"
"Marie"
"Yearning"
"How Am I to Know"
"You're Part of My Heart"
Announcements
"You're Stepping On My Toes"
"You Got the Best of Me"
"That's How It Goes"
"When Daylight Dawns"
"When Sleepy Stars Begin to Fall"
"Goodbye Lover, Goodbye"
"One Red Rose"
"The Things I Love"
"In the Blue of Evening"
"Just As Though You Were Here"
Frank Sinatra's Farewell to the Tommy Dorsey Orchestra
"The Song Is You"

Personnel
 Frank Sinatra - Vocals
 Tommy Dorsey and his Orchestra

References

Song Is You, The
Song Is You, The